Ron Hewitt may refer to:

 Ron Hewitt (footballer, born 1928) (1928–2001), Wales international football player
 Ron Hewitt (footballer, born 1924) (1924–2011), English footballer